Darber-e Razbashi (also Romanized as Dārber-e Rāzbāshī; also known as Rāzbāshī Dārbar) is a village in Beyranvand-e Shomali Rural District, Bayravand District, Khorramabad County, Lorestan Province, Iran. At the 2006 census, its population was 60, in 13 families.

References 

Towns and villages in Khorramabad County